Luca Verdecchia (born 24 May 1978, in Porto San Giorgio) is an Italian sprinter who specializes in the 60 and 100 metres.

Biography
Luca Verdecchia won 6 medals with the national relay team at the International athletics competitions. He has 10 caps in national team from 1999 to 2007.

National titles
He has won 1 time the individual national championship.
1 win in the 100 metres (2006)

See also
 Italy national relay team

References

External links
 

1978 births
Living people
Italian male sprinters
Athletics competitors of Fiamme Oro
World Athletics Championships athletes for Italy
Mediterranean Games gold medalists for Italy
Athletes (track and field) at the 2005 Mediterranean Games
Universiade medalists in athletics (track and field)
Mediterranean Games medalists in athletics
Universiade gold medalists for Italy
Universiade bronze medalists for Italy
Italian Athletics Championships winners
Medalists at the 1999 Summer Universiade
Medalists at the 2001 Summer Universiade
Medalists at the 2005 Summer Universiade